Col. William M. and Nancy Ralston Bond House is a historic home in Lockport in Niagara County, New York. It is a 2-story brick structure, with a -story side wing, constructed in 1823 in the late Federal / early Greek Revival style. The Niagara County Historical Society operates it as a house museum.

It was listed on the National Register of Historic Places in 1995.

References

External links
Bond, Col. William M. and Nancy Ralston, House - Lockport, NY - U.S. National Register of Historic Places on Waymarking.com
Niagara County Historical Society | Plan a Visit

Museums in Niagara County, New York
Houses on the National Register of Historic Places in New York (state)
Historic American Buildings Survey in New York (state)
Houses completed in 1823
Historic house museums in New York (state)
Houses in Niagara County, New York
Historical society museums in New York (state)
National Register of Historic Places in Niagara County, New York